Francisco Rivera Pérez, known as Paquirri (March 5, 1948 – September 26, 1984), was a Spanish bullfighter.

Death 
Paquirri was gored by a bull named "Avispado" (Spanish for street-smart, or wasp-like) during a bullfight in Pozoblanco (Córdoba), and died while he was being transported to Córdoba Hospital. His death led to legislative change that forced the bullrings to be equipped with intensive care units.

Family 
He was first married to Carmen Ordóñez, with whom he had two sons, Francisco Rivera Ordóñez & Cayetano Rivera Ordóñez. Both these sons are matadors and form part of the Ordóñez family bullfighting dynasty. After divorcing Carmen Ordóñez, he married the famous Spanish singer Isabel Pantoja, with whom he had a son named Francisco José Rivera Pantoja, better known as Kiko Rivera. His brother José Rivera Pérez, better known as "Riverita" was also bullfighter.

See also
 List of bullfighters

References

1948 births
1984 deaths
Bullfighters killed in the arena
Spanish bullfighters
Spanish Roman Catholics
Sport deaths in Spain